SCH 900271 is a nicotinic acid derivative designed to treat dyslipidemia. It reduced plasma free fatty acids levels, but without significant flushing, a side effect common with niacin that limits its usefulness. SCH 900271 is currently in human trials.

References

Hypolipidemic agents
Cyclopropanes
Pyrimidinediones